Zenker is the name of:

 Friedrich Albert von Zenker (1825–1898) was a German pathologist, who named:
 Zenker's degeneration 
 Zenker's diverticulum
 Zenker's fixative
 Zenker's paralysis
 Georg August Zenker (1855–1922), German gardener and naturalist
 Hans Zenker (1870–1932), German admiral
 Jonathan Carl Zenker (1799–1837), German naturalist
 Karl-Adolf Zenker (1907–1998) was a German admiral and son of Hans Zenker
 Christian Zenker (1975), German tenor
 Helmut Zenker (1949–2003), from Austria 
 Ramon Zenker, German music producer
 Rudolf Zenker (1903–1984), heart surgeon
 Wolfgang Zenker, (1898-1918), German military officer